Vemić is a Serbo-Croatian surname. Notable people with the surname include:

Dušan Vemić (born 1976), Serbian tennis coach and former player
Miloš Vemić (born 1987), Serbian volleyball player
Uroš Vemić (born 1987), Serbian-born Montenegrin footballer

Serbian surnames
Slavic-language surnames
Patronymic surnames